East African Air is a startup airline based in Dar es Salaam, Tanzania. It plans to operate from Dar-es Salaam as hub to regional destinations and Europe and America. The company was founded by African Diaspora businessmen originally from the Eastern part of Africa, Tanzania, Kenya, Uganda, Burundi and Rwanda. East African expects to obtain traffic rights to Jeddah, Saudi Arabia.

History 
East African Air Limited is a registered UK Private Limited Company. It has received investment over £2m primarily from European Capital Corporation guaranteed by main shareholders. Fly East African Air is a wholly owned subsidiary of East African Air Limited.

The Airline was founded to provide direct flights to Dar-es Salaam from UK. The parent company raised capital from Investors, local businesses and stock brokers and purchased two Boeing 737-200 and was in negotiation for another two BAE Jetstream 31. Domestic services was to commence in December 2009 with International flights to UK expected by mid of 2010.

Destinations
Fly East African will operates the following services (as of December 2009)

Domestic scheduled destinations: Dar es Salaam, Arusha, Kigoma, Kilimanjaro, Musoma, Mwanza, Shinyanga, Tabora and Zanzibar Airport.
International scheduled: Nairobi, Bujumbura, Johannesburg, Kigali.

Fleet
The Fly East African Air fleet includes the following aircraft

2 Boeing 737-200

On order 
2 BAE J31 Handley Page Jetstream
2 Boeing 777-200

External links
 Official site

Airlines of Tanzania
Airlines established in 2009
2009 establishments in Tanzania